Nederweert is a municipality and a town in southeastern Netherlands with a population of  as of  and has an area of  of which  is water.

Nederweert lies at the intersection of three channels: the Zuid-Willemsvaart, the Noordervaart and the Wessem-Nederweert Canal. In the 19th century these channels provided transport routes to export peat that was harvested from the Peel. These channels connect Nederweert to Maastricht and 's-Hertogenbosch.

History 
Nederweert was originally called 'Merefelt' which means 'amongst the lakes', though it was later named Weert van den nedersten eynde. A 'Weert' in  old Dutch means a high place in the landscape. This latter name later changed into Nederweert as it is called today.
 
Before the 14th century Nederweert was part of the municipality of Weert. The first reference which speaks of Nederweert as independent was in 1419.

Nederweert has been under rule of the Graven van Horn (the dukes of Horn) until 1701. Later in 1715 it became part of the southern states of the Netherlands.

In 1785 it was annexed by the French. During this era it was part of the Belgian departement of the Nedermaas.

Monuments 
The most prominent monument of Nederweert is the Sint-Lambertus Kerk. It is a Brabantine Gothic-style church that was built in 1467.

Population centres

Notable people 
 Margriet Tindemans (1951 in Nederweert – 2014) a musician, specializing in medieval music
 Marie Kessels (born 1954 in Nederweert) a Dutch poet and prose writer

Gallery

References

External links

Official website

 
Municipalities of Limburg (Netherlands)
Populated places in Limburg (Netherlands)